Otto Braun (28 September 1900 – 15 August 1974) was a German communist journalist and functionary of the Communist Party of Germany with a long and varied career. His most significant role was as a Comintern agent sent to China in 1934 to advise the Communist Party of China (CPC) on military strategy during the Chinese Civil War. At the time Braun adopted a Chinese name, Li De. It was only many years later that Otto Braun and "Li De" came to be known as the same person.

Early life
Otto Braun was born in Ismaning, Upper Bavaria, near Munich. Even though his mother was still alive, he grew up in an orphanage.

He enrolled at a teachers' training college in Pasing in the Munich area. In June 1918, Braun was drafted into the ranks of the Bavarian army, part of the Imperial German Army, but the First World War ended before he could face combat duty.

After the armistice he went back to complete his studies at the teachers' training college. However, he did not take a job as a primary school teacher. Rather, he joined the newly-founded Communist Party of Germany (KPD). He embarked on what would be a lifelong vocation and career and travelled widely, mainly in North Germany.

Communist activity in the 1920s and early 1930s
It seems that it was in 1921 that Braun became a full-time paid KPD party worker.

He was involved in an affair concerning the theft of some sensitive documents from Colonel Freyberg, a White Russian emigrant based in Berlin. For his part, he was detained by the police in July 1921. He was put on trial but managed to hide his communist connections and to convince the court that he was a "right-winger." The bias that was often exhibited by the judicial system of the Weimar Republic caused the masquerade to help him get off with a light sentence. In fact, he did not go to jail, but went into hiding.

By that time, he was already a central member of the KPD apparatus by not only regularly writing articles for the party papers but also, after 1924, heading the party's "counter-espionage" efforts. He was also deeply involved in its militia and paramilitary activities.

The police caught up with him again in September 1926. He first served his "Freyberg sentence" of 1922 and then was kept in detention at the Moabit Prison. However, on April 11, 1928, a band of Communists, including his then-lover Olga Benário, succeeded in staging his jail break.

The daring escape got worldwide publicity. Braun and Benário then made their way to Moscow, where they became involved in the Communist International. Both of them were at the Lenin School, which was operated by the Comintern. Braun went to the Frunze Military Academy while Benário worked as an instructor of the Communist Youth International, first in the Soviet Union, then in France and England, where she participated in coordinating anti-fascist activities.

Braun and Benário parted ways in 1931. She went on to marry the famous Brazilian revolutionary leader Luís Carlos Prestes and went to live in his country. She was finally arrested by the Getúlio Vargas dictatorship and extradited to Germany, where she was eventually killed by gas at the Bernburg Euthanasia Centre. She is remembered as a martyr by the Brazilian and German left. For his part, Braun embarked on the most significant and, in some ways, the most controversial, part of his revolutionary career, as the Comintern representative in China.

In 1933, Braun married the Chinese communist Xiao Yuehua. They had a son, but they divorced because Otto fell in love with a more beautiful and educated LI Lilian.

In 1938, Braun married another Chinese communist actress LI Lilian. On August 28, 1939, Braun flew back to the Soviet Union nd never met LI Lilian.

In China
In 1932, following his graduation at the Frunze Academy, Soviet Military Intelligence's Fourth Directorate dispatched Braun to Harbin in Manchuria, China. From there he traveled to Shanghai, where he joined the local Comintern bureau. There he was in military affairs under the orders of "General Kleber" (nom de guerre of Manfred Stern), who maintained a "military section" in the city, and in political issues under Arthur Ewert, a fellow German Communist.

However, Shanghai was at that time a backwater in Chinese revolutionary affairs, the local communist movement having been effectively crushed by Chiang Kai-shek's Kuomintang (KMT) in the Shanghai massacre of 1927. The Chinese Communists had subsequently retreated to the countryside and started to organize in the province of Jiangxi. In the later part of 1933 Braun arrived in Ruijin, at that time capital of the "Chinese Soviet Republic" set up by the surviving Chinese Communists, where he became a military adviser.

The precise circumstances of his getting this appointment and his activities in the following years are still debated with some aspects remaining unclear. As noted by Freddy Litten, who thoroughly researched this part of Otto Braun's career, "[Braun]'s memoirs are an important, though dubious, source for the events of these years".

At the time, the Kuomintang, perceiving the Communists as a dangerous threat to its rule, launched a series of vigorous attacks on the CPC in urban areas. Its forces came near to Ruijin, which was in danger of being surrounded and became untenable. The CPC initiated the Long March to escape this danger. Braun, under his assumed Chinese name "Li De", was nearly the only foreigner to participate in the Long March and might have even been the original proposer of the idea of embarking on such a march in an effort to reach the safer interior of China.

In the later part of 1934, Braun/Li De assumed a position of command in the early First Front Army, together with Zhou Enlai and Bo Gu, with authority to make all military decisions. Braun advocated for the First Front Army to directly attack the far larger and better-equipped KMT Army. The First Front Army's suffered great casualties and so CPC forces fell drastically from 86,000 to about 25,000, within a year.

In 1935, the CPC met at the Zunyi Conference, where Mao Zedong and Peng Dehuai expressed their opposition to Braun, Bo Gu and their tactics. Mao argued that the direct attacks were costing lives and suggested that smaller and less-well-equipped forces should run and surround the KMT by using the guerrilla tactics for which Mao was to become famed. (Mao already distrusted European advisors from the Comintern, especially since in the 1920s advisers such as the Dutch Henk Sneevliet had given  disastrous advice to the Chinese Communists.) Other military wing leaders agreed with Mao and so Braun and Bo Gu were removed as the military commanders, and Mao become the leader of the Long March. After this conference, the Comintern was pushed aside, and "Native Communists" took control of the CPC.

Still, Braun stayed in China until 1939 and participated in the Long March along with the CPC. No longer holding a military command, he was mainly involved in advisory work and some teaching of tactics.

Though never returning to China after le left in 1939, he continued to show interest in Chinese affairs for the rest of his life.

Soviet period in the 1940s
In 1939 Braun arrived in the Soviet Union. At the time, that was a very dangerous place for foreign communists, many of whom, iincluding German communists, were imprisoned, tortured or killed by Joseph Stalin's secret police (NKVD), despite being completely loyal to the revolutionary cause and having often undergone persecution for its sake in their own countries. Braun managed to avoid such a fate though he faced some political difficulties immediately upon his arrival.

The Moscow Foreign Languages Press gave him employment as an editor and translator. After the German invasion of the Soviet Union in 1941, use was made of his German antecedents by making him a "polit-instrukteur" striving to turn the loyalty of German officers captured by the Soviets. In that role, he used an old alias from the 1920s, "Kommissar Wagner". He later performed a similar tactic towards captive Japanese officers as well.

Between 1946 and 1948, he was based at Krasnogorsk, Moscow Oblast, where he lectured in the Antifascist Central School. Afterwards, he had another period of working in the Moscow Foreign Languages Press.

Return to Germany and later years
Only after the death of Stalin was Otto Braun allowed to return to his homeland after nearly three decades of exile.

Following his arrival at the German Democratic Republic (East Germany) Braun became a fellow at the Institute for Marxism-Leninism maintained by the Central Committee of ruling Socialist Unity Party (SED), as the Communist Party was officially called. His main responsibility was the publication in German of the writings of Vladimir Lenin.

He was First Secretary of the German Writers' Association from 1961 to 1963when he fell from grace. Already in his mid-sixties, he was for some time a pensioner doing some freelance translation from Russian.

His return to the authorities' good books was evident when in 1964 the ruling party's organ Neues Deutschland carried the revelation that the otherwise unknown Li De, involved in the Chinese Long March of the 1930s, had been in fact none other than the German Otto Braun.

This gave Braun the possibility and the impetus to write his Chinese Notes. As mentioned, researchers consider these as full of interesting information, particularly useful as offering a different angle to that of official Chinese Communist historiographybut in themselves far from objective or impartial. They were written in the late 1960s when Braun was also a fellow of the Institute for Social Sciences. The memoirs were published in book form at 1973 and translated to Chinese, English and other languages.

Braun died at age 74, while on vacation in Varna, Bulgaria. He was buried in East Berlin, and his obituaries appeared in Pravda and in The New York Times.

References

 
 "Otto Brauns frühes Wirken in China (1932–1935)" ("Otto Braun's Early Activity in China (1932–1935") by Freddy Litten .
 Freddy Litten (Frederick S. Litten), abstracts from "China and intelligence history" (on the Long March)
 Litten, who made a through research on Braun, gave the following note on his sources:
 The article on "Braun in Germany" is based on documents in archives in Berlin, Potsdam and Munich, contemporary newspaper reports and publications.
 "Braun in China" is based on Litten's own paper "Otto Brauns frühes Wirken in China (1932–1935)" .
 "Otto Braun's Curriculum Vitae" is based on some further unpublished documents (especially his privately held cv), but mostly on a wide array of publications in German, English, Russian and Chinese.

1900 births
1974 deaths
People from Munich (district)
People from the Kingdom of Bavaria
Communist Party of Germany politicians
Socialist Unity Party of Germany politicians
National Committee for a Free Germany members
People of the Chinese Civil War
German Comintern people
East German writers
Writers from Bavaria
Escapees from German detention
German escapees
Recipients of the Patriotic Order of Merit in gold
German expatriates in China
German male writers
Frunze Military Academy alumni